Karosa Š series  is a collective term for several modifications of Czechoslovak bus, which was made by the Karosa Vysoké Mýto in years 1964 (prototypes since 1961) to 1981.

History 

Š-Series buses began to be developed as a successor to Škoda 706 RTO, which was produced in three (or four) variants since 1958. The government resolution from the late 50s caused, that Karosa started developing a completely new high-capacity bus that (due to other governmental conditions) could no longer be modernization of type 706 RTO, but the company had to develop a completely new solution. This concept became semi-self supporting body, which was used by the company Karosa even after the end of production of buses Š series with (the letter Š stands for the engine manufacturer, the company Škoda). The first narrower doors were placed in front of the front overhang, any other doors were wide enough for two streams of passengers. Another requirement was good maneuverability, which was achieved by short wheelbase and split front axle. Engine, and other units were placed under the vehicle floor in the middle, and rear axle was propulsed (rear B axle in Karosa ŠM 16,5).

The very first bus from Š series, ŠM 11, was made in 1961 and unlike his followers was equipped with many parts from Western Europe. In the following years, other functional samples left the gates of Karosa. After production of test series of ŠM 11 was started serial production in 1964. Production ended in 1981, and 26,669 of these buses were made, of which approximately one-fifth was intended for export. The last bus in Czech have been in regular operation until 1994 in Opava and Plzeň. Many vehicles of Š Series retained as historical.

Š-Series buses were intended to be unified with trolleybus Škoda T 11 (the first Czechoslovak attempt to unify the bus with trolleybus). Body Parts for T 11 (almost identical with bodies for ŠM 11) were intended to be produced in Karosa, by electric equipment company Škoda. But due to the general downturn of trolleybus transport in the 60´s was the development of a trolleybus stopped. Total 8 T 11´s was made.

In production was Š series replaced by 700 series in 1981.

Variants 

 Karosa ŠM 11 - a standard three-door city bus.
 Karosa ŠL 11 - a two-door intercity bus, designed especially for ČSAD.
 Karosa ŠD 11 - Long distance Coach for long lines or for tours.
 Karosa ŠM 16,5 - a four-door articulated city bus (only prototype)

References

See also 

 List of buses

Buses manufactured by Karosa
Buses of the Czech Republic